Mount Jackson el.  is a mountain peak just north of the Madison River, in the Gallatin Range of Yellowstone National Park. Mount Jackson is named in honor of William Henry Jackson, chief photographer of the Hayden Geological Survey of 1871 and a member of several subsequent geological surveys in the park. Jackson's photographs are some of the earliest ever taken in Yellowstone.  The name was suggested by a park naturalist in 1935 but not awarded until 1937 when Jackson, who was still living gave his approval.  Jackson visited the park regularly until his death in 1942.

See also
Mountains and mountain ranges of Yellowstone National Park

Notes

Mountains of Wyoming
Mountains of Yellowstone National Park
Mountains of Teton County, Wyoming